The Sudanese Shadow Government is a political organization which announced its establishment on 24 December 2013 in Khartoum, Sudan. It is the first shadow government in Sudan.

A young Sudanese lawyer named Wael Omer Abdin called for the formation of a shadow government in Sudan in March 2011. The shadow government consists of seven ministers, and has the aim of putting pressure on the regime and influencing politics in the country.

References

Political organisations based in Sudan